Real Queer America: LGBT Stories From Red States is a 2019 nonfiction book written by Samantha Allen. The book documents a road trip Allen took in the summer of 2017 through LGBT communities in conservative parts of the United States, focusing on Utah, Texas, Indiana, Tennessee, Mississippi, and Georgia.

Critical reception
The New York Times wrote "Allen’s powerful book of memoir and reportage, Real Queer America, is decidedly more serious in tone, but it's no less entertaining. The Daily Beast reporter gathers stories from L.G.B.T.Q. people she met in conservative states across the country on a road trip she took in July 2017, the first summer of the Trump presidency."

The Los Angeles Times called Real Queer America “a book necessary for anyone in or allied with the queer community.”

Publishers Weekly labeled the book “the ultimate road-trip through rainbow-colored America.”  The book was nominated for a Lambda Literary Award for Transgender Non-fiction.

References

External links
Hachette Book Group
Goodreads

2019 non-fiction books
LGBT non-fiction books
2010s LGBT literature
Transgender non-fiction books
Little, Brown and Company books
LGBT literature in the United States